Thomas de Beauchamp, 11th Earl of Warwick, KG (c. 14 February 131313 November 1369), sometimes styled as Lord Warwick, was an English nobleman and military commander during the Hundred Years' War. His reputation as a military leader was so formidable that he was nicknamed 'the devil Warwick' by the French.
In 1348 he became one of the founders and the third Knight of the Order of the Garter.

Thomas was undoubtedly a brave warrior in battle and proved to be a strong military leader. For example, the 14th century Anonimalle Chronicle states that when news arrived of his landing at Calais, the Duke of Burgundy, whose forces were camped nearby, made a hasty retreat under cover of darkness to avoid an encounter with 'the devil Warwick'. 

He fought in Scotland as captain of the army against the Scots in 1337 at the age of 24. He also fought in the Hundred Years Wars with France, commanding the English victory at the Battle of Crecy in 1346.

Early life

Thomas de Beauchamp was born at Warwick Castle, Warwickshire, England to Guy de Beauchamp, 10th Earl of Warwick and Alice de Toeni. He served in Scotland frequently during the 1330s, being captain of the army against the Scots in 1337. He was hereditary High Sheriff of Worcestershire from 1333 until his death (in 1369). In 1344, he was also made High Sheriff of Warwickshire and Leicestershire for life.

Victor at Crécy and Poitiers

Warwick was Marshal of England from 1343/4 until 1369, and was one of the commanders at the great English victories at Crécy and Poitiers, as well as the Siege of Calais (1346).

Thomas de Beauchamp fought in all the French wars of King Edward III; he commanded the centre at the Battle of Crecy (where many of his relatives were killed, including his younger half-brother Alan la Zouche de Mortimer). He was trusted to be guardian of the sixteen-year-old Black Prince. 

He began the rebuilding of the Collegiate Church of Saint Mary in Warwick, supposedly using money received from the ransom of the archbishop of Sens, whom he captured at Poitiers, but that is an oversimplification.

Marriage and children

He married Katherine Mortimer, daughter of Roger Mortimer, 1st Earl of March. They had five sons and ten daughters:
 Guy de Beauchamp (died 28 April 1360); married Philippa de Ferrers, daughter of Henry de Ferrers, 2nd Lord Ferrers of Groby, and Isabel de Verdun, by whom he had two daughters: Elizabeth (died c. 1369), and Katherine, who became a nun. His daughters were, by entail, excluded from their grandfather's inheritance.
Thomas de Beauchamp, 12th Earl of Warwick (16 March 13398 August 1401), married Margaret Ferrers, daughter of William Ferrers, 3rd Lord of Groby, and Margaret de Ufford, by whom he had issue, including Richard Beauchamp, 13th Earl of Warwick.
 Reinbrun de Beauchamp (died 1361)
 William de Beauchamp, 1st Baron Bergavenny (c. 13438 May 1411); inherited the honour of Abergavenny. On 23 July 1392, married Lady Joan FitzAlan, daughter of Richard FitzAlan, 11th Earl of Arundel and Lady Elizabeth de Bohun, by whom he had a son, Richard de Beauchamp, 1st Earl of Worcester, and a daughter, Joan de Beauchamp, Countess of Ormond. Queen consort Anne Boleyn was a notable descendant of the latter.
 Roger de Beauchamp (died 1361)
 Maud de Beauchamp (died 1403); married Roger de Clifford, 5th Baron de Clifford, by whom she had issue, including Thomas de Clifford, 6th Baron de Clifford.
 Philippa de Beauchamp; married Hugh de Stafford, 2nd Earl of Stafford, by whom she had nine children.
 Alice Beauchamp (died 1383); married firstly John Beauchamp, 3rd Baron Beauchamp of Somerset, and secondly Sir Matthew Gournay. She died childless.
 Joan de Beauchamp; married Ralph Basset, 3rd Baron Basset of Drayton. She died childless.
 Isabel de Beauchamp (died 29 September 1416); married firstly John le Strange, 5th Baron Strange by whom she had a daughter, Elizabeth (1373-1383), and secondly, William de Ufford, 2nd Earl of Suffolk. Upon the latter's death, she became a nun. She died without living issue.
 Margaret de Beauchamp; married first Guy de Montfort. This marriage was childless. After his death in 1261, she became a nun until 1269.
 Elizabeth de Beauchamp; married Thomas de Ufford KG.
 Anne de Beauchamp; married Walter de Cokesey.
 Juliana de Beauchamp
 Katherine de Beauchamp; became a nun at Shouldham Priory.

Catherine Grandison, Countess of Salisbury was not his daughter, although she is presented as such in William Painter's Palace of Pleasure and in the Elizabethan play Edward III, which may be by William Shakespeare.

Death
Beauchamp's wife Katherine died on 4 August 1369. Beauchamp died three months later at Calais aged 56, on 13 November 1369, of the Black Death and was buried alongside his wife in the chancel of St. Mary's Church, Warwick, Warwickshire.

Ancestry

Images

References

Sources
 

1310s births
1369 deaths
14th-century English nobility
Earls of Warwick (1088 creation)
Garter Knights appointed by Edward III
People of the Hundred Years' War
People from Warwick
High Sheriffs of Warwickshire
High Sheriffs of Leicestershire
High Sheriffs of Worcestershire
14th-century deaths from plague (disease)
Male Shakespearean characters
Thomas
Infectious disease deaths in France
Sheriffs of Warwickshire